Blommersia domerguei is a species of frog in the family Mantellidae.
It is endemic to Madagascar.
Its natural habitats are subtropical or tropical moist lowland forests, subtropical or tropical moist montane forests, subtropical or tropical high-altitude grassland, swamps, and heavily degraded former forest.
It is threatened by habitat loss.

References

Mantellidae
Endemic frogs of Madagascar
Amphibians described in 1974
Taxa named by Jean Marius René Guibé
Taxonomy articles created by Polbot